Senator Virgin may refer to:

Harry R. Virgin (1854–1932), Maine State Senate
Noah Virgin (1812–1892), Wisconsin State Senate
William Wirt Virgin (1823–1893), American politician and jurist from Maine